The Leica M10-D is a digital Rangefinder camera released by Leica Camera on 24 October 2018. The M10-D succeeds the Leica M-D (Typ 262) in the Leica no-LCD screen line of digital cameras. Otherwise the M10-D is similar to the Leica M10.

In comparison with the M10, instead of the rear screen, the back contains an exposure compensation dial in black. Unlike the M-D (Typ 262), the M10-D has a dedicated ISO dial on the top plate. The M10-D also has a film advance lever, which functions only as a stylised thumb rest.

Other than the exposure, ISO, aperture and shutter speed settings, all other settings must be made via the Leica Fotos app. The app allows the camera to connect with a smartphone via Wi-Fi.

The M10-D has a 24 MP sensor and Maestro II processor. It offers an ISO of up to 50000 and a 5 frames per second burst rate.

The camera retailed for around $8,000 (USD) at its release.

References

External links

Leica M-mount cameras
Digital rangefinder cameras
Cameras introduced in 2018